Bringing Back the Funk is a studio album by Brian Culbertson released in 2008 on GRP Records. The album rose to No. 3 on the Billboard Jazz Albums chart and No. 15 on the Billboard Top R&B/Hip Hop Albums chart.

Overview
Bringing Back the Funk was executively produced by Maurice White.

Artists who feature on the album include Bootsy Collins, Ray Parker Jr., Musiq Soulchild, Larry Dunn, Ledisi, Maceo Parker, Larry Graham, Sheldon Reynolds and Gerald Albright.

Singles
The song "Always Remember" reached No. 1 on the Billboard Smooth Jazz Songs chart.

Track listing

Performers
Greg Adams (Trumpet, Flugelhorn, Horn Arrangements)
Gerald Albright  (Sax (Alto), Soloist, Guest Appearance) 
Derrick "D.O.A." (Allen Bass, Performer)
Michael Bland  (Drums, Performer) 
Lenny Castro  (Percussion, Performer)
Bootsy Collins  (Vocals, Producer, Engineer, Space Bass, Guest Appearance) 
Phelps "Catfish" Collins  (Guitar, Performer) 
Brian Culbertson  (Clarinet, Percussion, Piano, Trombone, Trumpet, Arranger, Keyboards, Vocals, Clavinet, Trumpet (Muted), Producer, Engineer, Clapping, Executive Producer, Fender Rhodes, Mixing, Soloist, Mini Moog) 
Cora Dunham	(Drums, Performer, Clapping) 
Larry Dunn	(Clapping, Fender Rhodes, Mini Moog) 
Sonny Emory	(Drums, Performer) 
Maurice Fitzgerald (Bass, Performer) 
Dan Fornero	(Trumpet, Flugelhorn, Performer) 
Kush Gardner	(Trumpet) 
Rick Gardner	(Trumpet, Performer) 
Matt Godina	(Assistant) 
Larry Graham	(Bass, Guest Appearance) 
Chance Howard	(Vocals, Vocals (background), Clavinet, Clapping, Synthesizer Bass, Guest Appearance) 
Ice Candi	(Vocals) 
Paul Jackson, Jr. (Guitar, Vocals, Performer, Clapping) 
Ron Jennings	(Guitar, Performer, Soloist) 
Ronnie Laws	(Sax (Tenor), Soloist, Guest Appearance) 
Tony Maiden	(Guitar, Guitar (Rhythm), Vocals, Performer, Clapping, Soloist)
Eric Marienthal	(Clarinet, Clarinet (Bass), Sax (Alto), Sax (Baritone), Sax (Tenor), Performer, Horn Arrangements) 
Eddie Miller	(Keyboards, Vocals, Vocals (background), Clapping, Fender Rhodes, Wurlitzer, Guest Appearance) 
Chris Miskel	(Drums, Performer) 
Musiq Soulchild (Vocals, Vocals (background), Clapping, Guest Appearance) 
Monty Neuble	(Synthesizer, Performer, Clapping, Talk Box)
David Pack	(Vocals (background), Performer) 
Maceo Parker	(Sax (Alto), Performer) 
Ray Parker Jr.	(Guitar (Acoustic), Guitar, Guitar (Electric), Vocals, Performer) 
Darlene Perri	(Tambourine, Vocals) 
Lori Perri	(Tambourine, Vocals) 
Sharon Perri	(Tambourine, Vocals) 
Ricky Peterson	(Organ (Hammond), Vocals, Performer, Clapping) 
Morris Pleasure	(Bass, Performer, Synthesizer Bass) 
Sheldon Reynolds (Guitar, Vocals, Vocals (background), Producer, Engineer, Clapping) 
Tom Scott	(Sax (Baritone), Sax (Tenor), Performer) 
Sam Sims	(Vocals, Performer, Clapping, Slap Bass) 
Rhonda Smith	(Bass, Performer, Clapping) 
Sonny Thompson	(Guitar)
Lee Thornburg	(Trumpet, Flugelhorn) 
David T. Walker	(Guitar, Guitar (Rhythm), Soloist, Guest Appearance) 
Bobby Ray Watson (Bass, Performer) 
Fred Wesley	(Trombone, Performer) 
Maurice White	(Performer, Clapping, Executive Producer, Mixing) 
Bernie Worrell	(Keyboards) 
Zion Planet 10	(Vocals)

Production
Rob Brill	(Assistant Engineer) 
David C. Britz	(Executive Producer, A&R, Management) 
Dahlia Ambach Caplin (A&R) 
Steve Cartotto	(Music Preparation) 
Anthony Caruso	(Assistant Engineer) 
Ed Cherney	(Engineer) 
Mitchell Cohen	(A&R)
Hiroko Ito	(Assistant Engineer) 
Bernie Grundman	(Mastering) 
Lisa Hansen	(Release Coordinator) 
Beth Herzhaft	(Photography) 
Bob Horn	(Engineer, Mixing) 
John Newcott	(Release Coordinator)
Dave K.	        (Stylist) 
James Karukas	(Piano Technician) 
Garry Kief	(Management) 
Eddie King	(Engineer) 
Hollis King	(Art Direction) 
Adam Krinsky	(Assistant Engineer) 
Merrilee McLain	(Hair Stylist) 
Bill Meyers	(Horn Arrangements) 
Cameron Mizell	(Release Coordinator) 
Evelyn Morgan	(A&R) 
Maytal Rozensher (Assistant) 
Jim Ryberg	(Engineer) 
Tommy Tucker	(Engineer) 
Ron Tuttle	(Piano Technician) 
Sachico Asano	(Graphic Design) 
Keith Albright	(Piano Technician) 
Scott Steiner	(Producer, Engineer) 
Michael Stever	(Horn Arrangements, Music Preparation, Transcription)

Charts

Albums

Singles

References

2008 albums
GRP Records albums
Brian Culbertson albums
Albums produced by Maurice White